The Memorial Union Building (MUB) is the University of New Hampshire's students' union building and the "heart of campus." The building also serves as the official New Hampshire War Memorial for soldiers killed in action since World War I.  Planning for a student union began in 1930s and fundraising began in 1945.  The MUB was opened in 1957*.  In the 1990s the MUB was renovated, and a dining hall was added on.

External links 
Official site
*History of UNH Buildings

University of New Hampshire buildings
University and college buildings completed in 1958
1958 establishments in New Hampshire
Modernist architecture in New Hampshire